Waneta is an unincorporated community located in Jackson County, Kentucky, United States.

References

Unincorporated communities in Jackson County, Kentucky
Unincorporated communities in Kentucky